Kristin Nicole Grubka (born December 17, 1992) is an American soccer player.

College career

Florida State University, 2011–2014
Grubka played for the Florida State Seminoles from 2011 to 2014. In her senior year she started all 26 games, helping lead the Seminoles defense to a program record 19 shutouts in 2014. She won the NCAA Championship with FSU in 2014.

Club career

Sky Blue FC, 2015–2016
Grubka was selected by Sky Blue FC with the 10th overall pick in the 2015 NWSL College Draft. She made 29 appearances over two seasons with Sky Blue. She was not included in Sky Blue's 2017 preseason roster, and was not picked up by another team.

References

External links 
 Sky Blue FC player profile
 

1992 births
Living people
American women's soccer players
National Women's Soccer League players
NJ/NY Gotham FC players
Women's association football defenders
Florida State Seminoles women's soccer players
Melbourne High School alumni
People from Melbourne, Florida
NJ/NY Gotham FC draft picks